Walcote is a small village in Warwickshire, England, one mile south of the Ancient Roman market town of Alcester.  It consists of just seventeen dwellings, ranging from a Victorian rectory to humble cottages.

External links

Villages in Warwickshire